John Minturn  was a three-masted packet ship that was lost on February 14, 1846. The ship left New Orleans headed for New York carrying $80,000 in goods and crew and passengers totaling 51 individuals. Captain Dudley Stark was Master of the ship. Her commander was Dudley Stark, who was a native of Stonington, Connecticut. When the weather got bad, John Minturn took on pilot boat Blossom's Pilot Thomas Freeborn who tried to guide the ship to port.

Construction and service 

The John Minturn was a three-masted packet ship. Captain Dudley Stark was Master of the ship. She was used as a passenger ship from New Orleans. She had accommodations for cabin, second cabin and steerage passengers.

End of service

Thirty-eight lives were lost aboard the ship. This represented the largest loss of life from the storm which claimed upwards of 60 victims. The disaster was immortalized in an 1846 hand-colored lithograph, Pilots' Monument, by Currier and Ives.

Later, newspapers reported widespread plundering of the dead. The reports prompted the New Jersey Senate to appoint a commission to investigate the validity of the claims. In a March 20, 1846, report by the commission to the Senate, the commission found the claims to be unwarranted.

The 1846 wreck sparked the development of the United States Life-Saving Service, an agency that would assist shipwrecked crews and passengers. That service would eventually merge with the United States Coast Guard.

In 1847 the New York Pilots constructed the Pilots' Monument in memory of their comrade pilot Thomas Freeborn (1808-1846). It is located at the top of Battle Hill in the Green-Wood Cemetery.

References

External links 
 Journal of the Proceedings of the Second Senate of the State Of New Jersey (1846)

1846 in New Jersey
Maritime incidents in January 1846
Shipwrecks of the New Jersey coast
Disasters in New Jersey
New Jersey
Transportation disasters in New Jersey
1840s ships